N'Dayi Kalenga  (born 12 December 1967 in Kamina) is a Congolese former professional football midfielder who played for Ankaragücü and Altay S.K. in Turkey.

Kalenga was included in the Zaire national football team at the 1996 African Cup of Nations.

References

External links

 Profile at TFF.org

1967 births
People from Kamina
Living people
Democratic Republic of the Congo footballers
Democratic Republic of the Congo expatriate footballers
Democratic Republic of the Congo international footballers
MKE Ankaragücü footballers
Altay S.K. footballers
Süper Lig players
Expatriate footballers in Turkey
Association football midfielders
1996 African Cup of Nations players
Democratic Republic of the Congo expatriate sportspeople in Turkey